Morattab is an SUV manufacturer based in Tehran, Iran. Since 1962, the company has produced versions of the Series Land Rover under license in Iran. The currently produced models are versions of the "Series IV" made by Santana Motor of Spain until the early 1990s, when the production tooling and design were sold to Morattab and shipped to Iran.

After the 1979 Iranian revolution they built unlicensed clones that differ significantly from the final Series III built by Land Rover in the United Kingdom. For example, Series IV models have parabolic leaf springs, one-piece windscreens and fully fitted interiors. Morattab also fits locally built 1.8-litre 4-cylinder petrol engines derived from Nissan instead of the 2.25-litre 4-cylinder or 3.3-litre 6-cylinder engines fitted to the Santana Series IV.

In 2003, they launched the production of the Ssangyong Musso.

History
The Morattab Industrial Manufacturing Company was founded in 1957 – it was named: Sherkat Sahami Am Sanaati Towlidi Morratab (the Morratab Industrial Com.) – initially as an agent and distributor of commercial vehicles and trucks, before branching into the manufacture of Land-Rovers under licence from Rover of England in 1962.  The Company was nationalised without compensation to its founders and rightful owners during the 1979 Iranian Revolution.

The Company's activities continued uninterrupted through the 1970s eventually evolving as one of the largest producers of four wheel drive vehicles in Iran. Following the 1979 Islamic Revolution, the Company ownership was transferred to the State, and IDRO (Industrial Development and Renovation Organization of Iran) took control of the Company as the Government industrial arm, and as such, the Company underwent a change in the management (expropriation). Despite this transition, production continued unabated and by 1983 the Company achieved record production levels.

In 1996, in conjunction with the industrial privatization and economic liberalization policies initiated by the Iranian Government, the Company was prepared for privatization.

The Government, through Industrial Development and Renovation Organization of Iran (IDRO), was retaining a 33 percent share of the Company until March 2000. After privatization, a comprehensive survey was made to maximize the potential of Morattab. It was within this context that the management of the company decided to expand the production into the manufacture of a modern four-wheel-drive vehicle and finally an agreement was signed with SsangYong Motor Company from Korea in 2002, and the Musso was launched into the market accordingly.

External links
https://web.archive.org/web/20080915021358/http://www.morattab.ir/
http://www.morattabkhodro.com/

Car manufacturers of Iran
Manufacturing companies based in Tehran